The I-League Golden Boot is an annual Indian association football award given to the top goalscorer at the end of the I-League season, the top domestic league competition in club Football in India, since its creation in 2007.

The top-scoring I-League Golden Boot winner is Ranty Martins Soleye with 32 goals in a 26-game season with Odafe Onyeka Okolie holding the record when the league was an 18-game season with 22 goals. Ranti won the award for the most times with five wins however Odafe has won the award most times for a single club, winning thrice while playing for Churchill Brothers.

Aser Pierrick Dipanda of Mohun Bagan is the latest winner of the Golden Boot, his consecutive second. During the 2017–18 season, he scored 13 goals in 18 matches.

Recipients
As of the March 2018 six players have won the golden boot award. Only three player has won the award more than once with Ranti winning the award most times with five wins. Winning the golden boot though might not translate into league success as thrice once in eleven I-League seasons as the team which has the golden boot winner won the league as well and the latest was in 2015-16 when scoring leader Sunil Chhetri and his team, Bengaluru won the league.

List of Golden Boot winners

The following table is a list of winners of the I-League Golden Boot per season, detailing their club, goal tally, actual games played, and their strike rate (goals/games).

Leading Indian goalscorer
Ever since the beginning of the I-League in 2007, only two Indian players have been the I-League Golden Boot winners with Sunil Chettri winning the award in 2013-14 season and Bidyashagar Singh winning the award in 2020–21 season. The following table lists the top Indian goalscorer in each season and their overall ranking in that season's top scorer table.

See also
List of Indian football champions

External links
I-League.org Official website of I-League

Indian football trophies and awards
Awards established in 2007
Golden Boot